William George Baker (January 16, 1885 – April 9, 1960) was a railway conductor and political figure in Saskatchewan. He represented Moose Jaw City in the Legislative Assembly of Saskatchewan from 1921 to 1929 as a Labour and then Liberal-Labour member and then from 1938 to 1944 as a Liberal.

He was born in Owen Sound, Ontario, and was the son of Wesley Baker and Mary McTavish. William George Baker was educated in his birthplace of Owen Sound, Ontario. In 1912, Baker married Pearl Green. He worked for the Canadian Pacific Railway as a conductor. Baker ran unsuccessfully for a seat in the provincial assembly in 1917 and in a 1918 by-election before being elected in 1921. He was defeated when he ran for reelection in 1929, 1934 and 1944.

Electoral results (partial)

References 

Saskatchewan Liberal Party MLAs
1885 births
1960 deaths
Conductor (rail)
People from Owen Sound
People from Moose Jaw